Today, the museums of Uzbekistan store over two million artifacts, evidence of the unique historical, cultural, and spiritual life of the Central Asian peoples that have lived in the region.

According to the Statistical Internet Survey, carried out from May 7 to August 27, 2008, the largest proportion of those surveyed (39%) visit the country because of their interest in the architectural and historical sites of Uzbekistan. The next-largest group (24%) visit Uzbekistan to observe its culture, way of life and customs. 

Tourist activities in Uzbekistan range from outdoor activities, such as rock-climbing, to exploration of its rich archeological and religious history.

In 2019, 6.75 million tourists visited Uzbekistan. The industry earned a total of $1.68 billion. The tourism industry has been impacted significantly by the COVID-19 pandemic, with both tourist numbers and revenue dropping heavily. Each autumn, the Uzbek travel industry holds an International Tourism Fair.

Uzbekistan is located on the Great Silk Road and many neighboring countries (including Kazakhstan, Kyrgyzstan, Tajikistan and Turkmenistan) promote their countries based on their location along the Great Silk Road.

The World Tourism Organization's Silk Road Office was opened in 2004 in Samarkand. This office was commissioned to coordinate the efforts of international organisations and national tourism offices of countries located on the Silk Road. Uzbekistan is also a member of The Region Initiative (TRI), a tri-regional umbrella of tourism related organisations. TRI functions as a link between three regions----South Asia, Central Asia, Caucasus and Eastern Europe which is also by Armenia, Bangladesh, Georgia, Kazakhstan, Kyrgyzstan, India, Pakistan, Nepal, Tajikistan, Russia, Sri Lanka, Turkey and Ukraine.

Visitors by countries 
Visitors arriving to Uzbekistan were from the following countries of nationality:

Mountaineering, hiking and rock-climbing
The southeast portion of the country contains the western ends of the Tien Shan mountains. The mountains contain active forms of tourism such as mountaineering and rock climbing. Most well known for its ease of access from Tashkent is the Greater Chimgan peak (3,309 m) of the Chatkal Range. This place serves as a commencement for many routes of hiking, climbing, horse riding, mountain skiing and hang-gliding. There are several ski and mountain resorts in Uzbekistan, among which (Chimgan) was built in Soviet times and a more modern one (Amirsoy) which opened in 2019, both resorts are available for visiting in other seasons.

Architectural and historical sights
Samarkand with its Registan, Bibi-Khanym Mosque, Gur-Emir and Shah-i-Zinda, Bukhara with its Po-i-Kalyan Complex, Ark citadel, Samanid Mausoleum and Lyabi Khauz Ensemble, and Khiva with its intact inner city Ichan Kala, mosques, madrasahs, minarets, walls and gates are sites of tourism.

The historical center of Samarkand is a World Heritage Site. Samarkand contains many unique monuments of culture and architecture, which are preserved as masterpieces of Islamic art and architecture. The necropolis of Shah-i-Zinda is a popular tourist attraction. It underwent a controversial restoration in 2005 which replaced much of the aging terracotta and mosaic façade. The general conference of UNESCO accepted the decision of inclusion in the list of anniversaries the celebrating of 2750th anniversary of Samarkand.

Tashkent contains sights as Mausoleum of Sheikh Zaynudin Bobo and the Sheihantaur or Mausoleum of Zangiata.

Tourism in Khorezm Province and Karakalpakstan
Ancient Khiva is one of three most important tourism centers of Uzbekistan with historical cultural and ethnographic potential. The territory of the Khorezm Province and Karakalpakstan is strewn with natural, historic, architectural and archeological sites. The Khorezm Province itself possesses near to 300 historic monuments. 
 
In the last few years, the tourism potential at the region was improved with some new facilities and attractions. One of them is the Savitsky Museum in the town of Nukus, which houses a collection of works of avant-garde art. The museum also has regional collection. A number of "ecological tours" are organized to the ship cemetery located in Muynak area along what was once the coastline of the Aral Sea.

In 2005 Khorezm was visited by 43,000 tourists, of which foreigners accounted for 19,700. The majority of them came from countries such as France, Germany, Israel, Great Britain, Australia and Japan. The visitors of Khiva were mostly at the age of 50-70 (46%); about 21% of tourists were of the age 30–40. 32% of the visitors of Khorezm was independent travelers, that received visa support" from local travel agencies.

After the modernization of the airport at Urgench, it received international status. Now it corresponds to the first category of ICAO.

Wildlife areas in the desert and other attractions on nomadic ways
Desert fauna of Kyzyl Kum includes many kinds of rare animals. There is a Kyzyl Kum nature reserve at the flood-land (tugai) drained by the Amu-Darya. Another reserve (eco-centre) "Djeyran" is located 40 km to the south of Bukhara.

The region of the Aydar Lake is an area of potential for fishing, yurting and camel-back riding tourist activities.

In addition to fauna common for Kyzyl Kum, there are many kinds of water birds migrating from Aral Sea that make their homes around the lake. Many sorts of fish were introduced to the Aydar Lake, which nowadays works as a source of industrial fishing.

Another point of interest the Sarmish Gorge (Better known as Sarmishsay) is located on the southern slopes of the Karatau mountain range, 30–40 km to the north-east of the city of Navoi (Kermine) in Uzbekistan. This place is famous for various ancient monuments of anthropogenic activity concentrated in an area of about 20 km2. The sights include flint quarries, mines, old settlements, burial mounds, crypts and petroglyphs, including monuments of the Middle Ages, early Iron Age, Bronze Age and even the Stone Age. There are over 4,000 petroglyphs still intact in Sarmishsay. Since ancient times this territory has been a sacred zone, where locals performed their sacred ceremonies on holy days.

Religious tourism
Uzbekistan is a country with predominantly Islamic roots. More than 160 Muslim sacred relics are located in the country.

A large number of tourists have been visiting Uzbekistan because of their religious-based interest. Uzbekistan is home to many Islamically significant sites such as the Mausoleum of Sheikh Zaynudin Bobo, Sheihantaur and Mausoleum of Zangiata in Tashkent, the Bahauddin Complex in Bukhara, as well as the Bayan-Quli Khan Mausoleum, Saif ed-Din Bokharzi Mausoleum and many other monuments related to Sufism are in Uzbekistan. Imam Abu Mansur al-Maturidi is buried in Samarkand, Imam Bukhari in Bukhara, and Imam Tirmidhi is in Termez, near the Afghan border.

Dental Tourism
Lately, many modern dental clinics were established in Uzbekistan. Prices here are cheaper in comparison with Western and Russian clinics.

Gastronomic Tourism
Popular Uzbek cuisine includes the following:

Palov, the Uzbek version of pilaf -  is an everyday dish as well as a dish for  events like weddings, parties and holidays. Rice is the most important component of palov, along with certain spices, raisins, peas or quince which are added to give it extra flavor.

Bread is considered holy for the Uzbek people.

Soups are of special importance. Uzbek soup is rich with vegetables and seasonings and contains many carrots, turnips, onions and greens. Most popular is Uzbek Shurpa. Shurpa is a meat and vegetable soup.

Shashlyk, also known as kebabs, consists of skewered chunks of mutton barbecued over charcoal and served with sliced raw onions and non (round unleavened bread).

Samsa (meat pies) is a pastry pie stuffed with meat and onion or pumpkin, potato, cabbage, mushrooms or nuts baked in a tandyr. Tandyr is a traditional cylindrical clay oven, heated with coal. Skill is needed when placing the raw samsas or non onto the inside wall of the oven.

Lagman is a thick noodle soup with thinly sliced fried meat and vegetables.

Manty are large dumplings stuffed with finely chopped meat, seasoned with various spices and a large amount of onion, then steamed in a special pot.

Wine Tourism
Uzbekistan is not significantly relevant to the main wine-growing powers of the world, however, the country has a long history of winemaking and wine culture.
Tashkentvino kombinati is one of the oldest companies in the industry, founded in 1867 on the outskirts of Tashkent, near the shore of the channel Salar. Tashkentvino produces a range of quality spirits.Wine Factory become popular not only in Russia but also abroad. These wines, like "Red Tashkent", "Oporto", "Sultan", "Cahors" won gold and silver medals at the Moscow Polytechnic Exhibition in 1872 and at the World Exhibition in Paris in 1878.

Accessibility of the country
Most travel involves entering and leaving Uzbekistan through Tashkent, the capital city of Uzbekistan. The city is serviced by an international airport, a domestic airport, two Vokzals (railway stations), and numerous bus stations. Experienced travelers try to avoid Tashkent International airport.  Tashkent is serviced by Uzbekistan Airways, Korean Air, airBaltic, Asiana Airlines, Turkish Airlines, Transaero, Aeroflot, Czech airlines, Iran air, air Astana, S7 airlines seven more airports of Uzbekistan have international status. Those airports are Samarkand, Bukhara Urgench Namangan Airport, Andizhan Airport, Fergana Airport and Nukus Airport. Besides local flights and some regular international flights, almost exclusively to Russia along with occasional tourist charters to Samarkand, Bukhara, Nukus and Urgench. The tickets for domestic flights can be reserved or purchased outside of the country at Uzbekistan Airways offices or agencies or via a number of online websites. Uzbekistan Airways transported more than 1.7 million passengers in 2005.

At the end of 2005, the Tashkent airport had put in operation a new arrival hall for local airlines, with the new addition meeting modern requirements. Its technical equipment allows it to serve up to 600 passengers per day.

Photo gallery

See also
Visa policy of Uzbekistan

References

External links

 The Region Initiative (TRI)
 Tourism in Uzbekistan
 Visum Usbekistan online beantragen
 Ziyarat Tourism in Uzbekistan

 
Economy of Uzbekistan
Uzbekistan

bn:উজবেকিস্তানের পর্যটন